Every 1's a Winner  is the fourth studio album by British band Hot Chocolate. It was released in April 1978 on the RAK Records label in the UK and the Infinity Records label in the US. The album peaked at number 30 on the UK Albums Chart and number 31 on the US Billboard 200.

The original release included nine songs. "So You Win Again", the album's first single, was the band's first number-one single in the UK and charted at number thirty-one in the US. The second single, "Put Your Love in Me", reached number 10 in the UK but failed to chart in the US. The title track and third single reached number six in the US, making it the band's second-highest charting single in the US behind "You Sexy Thing", and number twelve in the UK.

The album was re-released on CD in 2009 with five bonus tracks.

Track listing
Side one
 "Every 1's a Winner" – 4:49
 "Confetti Day" – 4:39
 "Love Is the Answer One More Time" – 2:57
 "Sometimes It Hurts to Be a Friend" – 5:24

Side two
 "So You Win Again" (Russ Ballard) – 4:31
 "Stay with Me" (Tony Connor, Harvey Hinsley, Patrick Olive) – 4:07
 "Run Away Girl" – 3:25
 "I'm Going to Make You Feel Like a Woman" – 3:41
 "Put Your Love in Me" – 5:46

CD bonus tracks (2009)
 "A Part of Being with You" – 2:56
 "Let Them Be the Judge" – 3:26
 "The Power of Love" (Connor, Hinsley, Olive) – 3:19
 "I'll Put You Together Again" – 3:52
 "West End of Park Lane" – 3:30

Personnel
Hot Chocolate
Errol Brown – lead vocals
Harvey Hinsley – guitars, backing vocals
Larry Ferguson – keyboards, Moog synthesizer
Patrick Olive – bass guitar, backing vocals
Tony Connor – drums

Production
Mickie Most – producer
Phil Hendriks – liner notes

Charts

Certifications

References

Hot Chocolate (band) albums
1978 albums
Rak Records albums
Infinity Records albums
Albums produced by Mickie Most
Albums with cover art by Hipgnosis